Nyssodrysilla is a genus of beetles in the family Cerambycidae, containing the following species:

 Nyssodrysilla irrorata (Melzer, 1927)
 Nyssodrysilla lineata Gilmour, 1962
 Nyssodrysilla vittata (Melzer, 1934)

References

Acanthocinini